National Road 142 is a national road of Cambodia. The National Road 53 joins the NR 142 at the town of Romeas in Kampong Chhnang Province. The road connects the town  to National Highway 138.

Roads in Cambodia
Kampong Chhnang province